Tumebacillus is a genus of Gram-positive, rod-shaped, spore-forming bacteria. Members of the genus can be motile or non-motile, and form white or yellow colonies on R2A agar.

The genus was first proposed in 2008 from the discovery of a potentially 5000-7000 year-old bacterium from Canadian high arctic permafrost, which would become the type strain of the genus T. permanentifrigoris. The genus name was derived from Latin tume (from tumefacere, to make swollen) and bacillus (small rod), referring to the swollen sporangia produced by T. permanentifrigoris and the shape of the cells.

Members of this genus have been isolated from arctic permafrost, soil samples, cassava wastewater, decomposing algal scum, river water, and the gut of a vulture. Tumebacillus was found during surveys of nasal airways of infants, an underground subway in Norway, and a mountain observatory in Austria.

Phylogeny
The currently accepted taxonomy is based on the List of Prokaryotic names with Standing in Nomenclature (LPSN) and National Center for Biotechnology Information (NCBI)

See also
 List of bacterial orders
 List of bacteria genera

References

Bacillales
Bacteria genera